Baba Mensah (born 20 August 1994) is a Ghanaian footballer who plays as a defender for IFK Mariehamn in the Finnish Veikkausliiga.

Club career
He joined Ilves in the Finnish Veikkausliiga for the 2017 season.

Before the 2022 season, he moved to another Finnish club IFK Mariehamn.

Honours

Individual
Veikkausliiga Team of the Year: 2019

References

External links 
 

1994 births
Living people
Ghanaian footballers
Ghana under-20 international footballers
Ghana international footballers
Association football defenders
International Allies F.C. players
BK Häcken players
Viborg FF players
FC Ilves players
Klubi 04 players
IFK Mariehamn players
Allsvenskan players
Veikkausliiga players
Ykkönen players
Ghanaian expatriate footballers
Expatriate footballers in Sweden
Ghanaian expatriate sportspeople in Sweden
Expatriate men's footballers in Denmark
Ghanaian expatriate sportspeople in Denmark
Expatriate footballers in Finland
Ghanaian expatriate sportspeople in Finland